Anu Prestonia is an African-American hairdresser based in New York. She is considered an expert in the field of natural hair styling for black women.

References

External links 
 Official website

Year of birth missing (living people)
Living people
American hairdressers
People from New York (state)